This is a list of films of Stan Laurel, as an actor without Oliver Hardy. For the filmography of Laurel and Hardy as a team, see: Laurel and Hardy filmography.

Notes

References
 
 

Male actor filmographies
British filmographies
American filmographies